Sheboygan Lutheran High School is a private secondary school in Sheboygan, Wisconsin near the University of Wisconsin–Sheboygan campus on the city's southwest side. It is operated by the Lutheran High School Association of the Greater Sheboygan Area, Inc., an association of Lutheran Church–Missouri Synod congregations in the Sheboygan area.

History
The school was opened in 1978 by a group of Lutherans. The school dedicated its first building in 1980 and has added two additions to the campus. In 2011, it opened Neat Repeats Thrift Shop, a community thrift shop in Plymouth, Wisconsin, to benefit the school.

Religious background
Sheboygan Lutheran High School is affiliated with the Lutheran Church–Missouri Synod (LCMS). A majority of the faculty and staff are members of congregations belonging to the LCMS.
 
All teaching at the school conforms with the Lutheran Confessions (Book of Concord). The school accepts students from a wide variety of Christian and non-Christian backgrounds.

Curriculum
Sheboygan Area Lutheran High School offers a Christian college preparatory curriculum.

Music and other extra curricular activities 
Choir: Chamber Choir, Konzertchor
Band: Concert band, Jazz band, pep band, Pit Orchestra
Other extra-curricular activities: fall and spring drama, forensics, national honor society, student council

Athletics 
The school's sports teams compete in the WIAA and the school belongs to the Big East Conference.

Fall sports: boys' soccer, boys' American football (combined team with Sheboygan County Christian High School and Kohler High School; home games are played at Kohler's field), girls' volleyball, boys' cross country (Division 3 champions 2004, 2005 and 2006), girls' cross country (Division 3 runners-up 2008), and girls' swimming.

Winter sports: boys' basketball (2011-12 & 2018-19 Division 5 champions), girls' basketball and dance team.

Spring sports: girls' softball, boys' track, girls' track, boys' golf, girls' soccer and co-ed trap shooting.

Summer sports: boys' baseball.

Notable alumni 
 Sam Dekker, former NBA player
Joe Leibham, former member of the Wisconsin Senate from the 9th district

References

External links

Sheboygan Lutheran High School
Neat Repeats Thrift Shop

High schools in Sheboygan, Wisconsin
Private high schools in Wisconsin
Lutheran schools in Wisconsin
Schools in Sheboygan County, Wisconsin
Secondary schools affiliated with the Lutheran Church–Missouri Synod